Shilovo is a rural locality (a selo) and the administrative center of Shilovsky Selsoviet, Kalmansky District, Altai Krai, Russia. The population was 418 as of 2013. There are 5 streets.

Geography 
Shilovo is located 21 km northwest of Kalmanka (the district's administrative centre) by road. Trud is the nearest rural locality.

References 

Rural localities in Kalmansky District